Farpad (drone)  is an Iranian hand-launched unmanned aerial vehicle; which was unveiled by the Iranian Army during the military drills underway in Iran’s strategic southeastern areas.

Name 
This domestically-manufactured drone, dubbed ‘Farpad,’ (فرپاد) is considered as the latest surveillance-aircraft of its sort to join the battery of Islamic Republic of Iran Army Ground Forces (NEZAJA), the acronym derived from the Persian name of the Army’s Ground Forces.

Abilities 
This hand-launched unmanned aerial vehicle can fly as far as twenty kilometers (equivalent to twelve miles) for a period of time – in 45 minutes. Farpad's weight is approximately 4 kg. This drone is utilized in reconnaissance missions and is able of either storing-information or transferring-data via online connection. In case of jamming --attacks-- by the enemy, this unmanned aerial vehicle would be returned to the (war) base, by utilizing its specific autopilot.

See also 
 List of military equipment manufactured in Iran
 Islamic Republic of Iran Army Ground Forces

References

Post–Cold War military equipment of Iran
Unmanned military aircraft of Iran
Iranian military aircraft
Aircraft manufactured in Iran